Jules-Henri Desfourneaux (17 December 1877, in Bar-le-Duc – 1 October 1951) was the last French executioner to officiate in public. He came from a long line of executioners named Desfourneaux stretching back many hundreds of years. Like all French executioners since 1792 the death penalty was carried out by beheading with a guillotine.

Desfourneaux was recruited by his predecessor Anatole Deibler and attended his first execution as second assistant in 1909. Following the death of Deibler in 1939—the latter having died of a heart attack in a Metro station while en route to his 300th execution—he was elected chief and was in charge of the last public execution in France on 17 June 1939, when he guillotined the five-time murderer Eugène Weidmann.

This execution was also notable as it is one of the few ever filmed, having been shot from a private apartment near the prison. For reasons unknown, Desfourneaux insisted that Greenwich rather than summertime dawn should be the official hour. This meant that contrary to custom, Weidmann was executed in broad daylight. This, combined with the public revelry around the jail (cafes were given an all-night licence extension, wine flowed and jazz blared on radios) and the filmed evidence, was largely responsible for the government's decision to hold all future executions behind closed doors.

Desfourneaux was involved in further controversy during World War II when required by the Vichy Government to execute communists and members of the French Resistance, notably , which led to the resignation of his assistants, André Obrecht, who was his cousin, and the Martin brothers, Georges and Robert. He was also responsible for the first guillotining of women since the late 19th century, including, famously, an abortionist named Marie-Louise Giraud in 1943. He put to death the axe-killer Germaine Godefroy, the last woman executed in France, on 21 April 1949.

Escaping retribution after the war, Desfourneaux increasingly turned to drink, a problem compounded by the suicide of his son. He was rejoined as first assistant in 1945 by Obrecht, who, despite his increasing dislike of Desfourneaux, could see a potential future as chief executioner looming. Further disagreements followed and Obrecht resigned for the second time in 1947.

Desfourneaux continued working until October 1951 when, whilst still in office and almost insane, he died. His eventual successor was Obrecht, who officiated until 1976, one year before the last execution in France; the death penalty was abolished in 1981.

References

Sources
 Flanner, Janet. Paris was Yesterday. 1972. The Viking Press, 1972. Print.

1877 births
1951 deaths
People from Bar-le-Duc
French executioners